This is a list of Kosovo women's national football team results from 2017 to 2019.

History

First steps: Participating in a tournament
Kosovo before the start of World Cup qualifications participated at 2017 Turkish Women's Cup, Kosovo lost all three matches of this tournament against Poland (0–5), which was also her first international match as a FIFA member, against Romania (0–3) and against the host Turkey (2–4).

Debut in World Cup and Euro qualifications
Kosovo began to make their debut in the 2019 FIFA Women's World Cup qualification, where Kosovo was drawn with Albania, Greece and Malta. The Kosovars despite the efforts failed to qualify and finished last in the group with three losses.

After failing to qualify for the 2019 FIFA Women's World Cup, Kosovo participated in the UEFA Women's Euro 2021 qualifying, together with Estonia, Russia, Slovenia, Turkey and 2019 World Cup runners-up finisher Netherlands, the Kosovars created their first big surprise, defeating Turkey in a 2–0 home win, which was also the team's first-ever competitive win, victory which increased the enthusiasm which unfortunately did not last long and after the positive results began to experience a decline which resulted in disqualification.

Fixtures and results

2017

2018

2019

Kosovo versus other countries
Head-to-head records are included only matches as FIFA member.

Notes and references

Notes

References

External links
 
Kosovo (women) News about the team

Kosovo
women's national football team results (2017–2019)